Cerna is a commune in Tulcea County, Northern Dobruja, Romania. It is composed of four villages: Cerna, General Praporgescu, Mircea Vodă (historical name: Acpunar), and Traian. The commune is inhabited by a large number of Megleno-Romanians.

Demographics
Estimates of the number of Megleno-Romanians in this village vary from 1,200 to 2,000, and they form the ethnic majority of it.

In 1940, according to the stipulations of the Treaty of Craiova, the Bulgarian population from Cerna was resettled to Southern Dobruja, mainly to the village of Turcsmil, which was renamed Nova Cherna (New Cerna) in the memory of their former place of origin. They were replaced by the current Megleno-Romanian local population. The Megleno-Romanian Dumitru Ciotti was mayor of the commune of Cerna from 1941 to 1942.

Notable natives
 Panait Cerna (1881–1913), poet, philosopher, literary critic, and translator

References

Communes in Tulcea County
Localities in Northern Dobruja
Megleno-Romanian settlements